The 1987 Dulux British Open was a professional ranking snooker tournament, that was held from 15 February to 1 March 1987 with television coverage on ITV and Channel 4 beginning on 20 February at the Assembly Rooms in Derby, England.
 


Main draw

The Last 64 was played at Solihull in November 1986. The last 32 onwards was played at Derby.

Final

References

British Open (snooker)
1987 in snooker
1987 in British sport
British
British